Chambers of rhetoric were dramatic societies in the Low Countries. Their members were called Rederijkers (singular Rederijker), from the French word 'rhétoricien', and during the 15th and 16th centuries were mainly interested in dramas and lyrics. These societies were closely connected with local civic leaders and their public plays were a form of early public relations for the city.

History
The first chambers of rhetoric were founded in Flanders around the 15th century; they later flowered in Holland, where they were an important part of the literary scene in the Dutch Golden Age and experimented with poetic form and structure. Most Dutch cities sponsored a chamber of rhetoric, and many cities had more than one, which competed with each other during prize contests. The building that currently houses the Frans Hals Museum was built with the proceeds of a lottery in which chambers of rhetoric participated from all over the country. The Haarlem society Trou moet Blycken still has many of the blazons that it kept as host of that lottery.

At the start of the 16th century, Antwerp had three rederijker societies, the "Violieren", the "Olijftak", and the "Goudbloem", while Brussels and Ghent each had four rederijker societies.

An important chamber of rhetoric in the Netherlands was "De Egelantier" in Amsterdam: Coster, Bredero, Hooft and Roemer Visscher were all members of this society. During the Protestant Reformation the society sided with the reformers against the city government and enjoyed its most blooming period despite receiving very little funding from official sources.

Because many of the rederijkers were by definition amateurs, the literary quality of their work was often rather low, and in the 18th century, some chambers of rhetoric were spoken of with contempt. One work of literary historical importance that came from the Rederijkers is the play Elckerlijc (Everyman).

By the 17th century many chambers enjoyed the services of semi-professional actors, personagiën, who did not pay membership fees and worked in exchange for free food and drink (provided after rehearsals and performances) and for exemption from other civic obligations.

Social functions

Apart from providing entertainment (recitations, plays, performances) during civic festivities, and maintaining literary contacts between cities, chambers of rhetoric had many of the typical social functions of a guild or confraternity, such as attending members' funerals, holding collections for sick or impoverished members, and providing wedding presents for members getting married.

See also
 List of chambers of rhetoric
 Medieval Dutch literature
 Flemish literature

References

 Conformisten en rebellen: Rederijkerscultuur in de Nederlanden (1400-1650), 2003 (Dutch)
 Meijer, Reinder. Literature of the Low Countries: A Short History of Dutch Literature in the Netherlands and Belgium. New York: Twayne Publishers, Inc., 1971, pp. 55–57, 62.
 Van Bruaene, A.L., Repertorium van de Rederijkerskamers in de Zuidelijke Nederlanden (Dutch) Overview of the Chambers of Rhetoric in the Southern Netherlands

 
European literature
Dutch literature
Literary societies
Arts in the Netherlands